WSMK (99.1 MHz, "Smokin' 99.1") is a commercial FM radio station licensed to Buchanan, Michigan, and serving the South Bend metropolitan area.  It is owned by Marion R. Williams and broadcasts a Rhythmic contemporary radio format.  The station's website says it is "Michiana's longest-standing, undefeated, baddest hip hop station."   WSMK covers the Michiana area of Michigan and Indiana, including South Bend, Elkhart, Benton Harbor and Michigan City, although with less power than the major FM stations in the local radio market.

The station has an effective radiated power of 6,000 watts.  The studios, offices and transmitter are off South Philip Road in Niles, Michigan.

History
WSMK signed on the air in 1991.  It was an urban contemporary station known as "Smokin 99.1."  This was the second Urban station in the Michiana area, the first having been the former WLLJ AM 910 in Cassopolis, which later switched to oldies as WGTO.

On February 4, 2005, 95.7 WYPW, formerly adult contemporary WLRX, became "Power 95.7" which put "Smokin 99" in direct competition for Urban and Hip Hop music listeners. (WYPW is now Catholic radio WRDI.)  In 2006, WSMK decided to tweak its format to a Rhythmic Adult Contemporary approach and became "Movin 99.1, Michana's Greatest Hits," with the format delivered via satellite from Waitt Radio Networks.

In October 2010, with WYPW changing to classic rock as WAOR, 99.1 WSMK transitioned back to locally originating programming and brought back the "Smokin' 99.1" slogan.  The station's website, at the time, said it features such artists as Beyoncé, Usher, Jay-Z, Katy Perry, Lady Gaga, Eminem, Rihanna and Nicki Minaj.

References

Michiguide.com - WSMK History

External links

SMK
Rhythmic contemporary radio stations in the United States
Radio stations established in 1996